Galaxy was a short-lived British satellite television channel, owned and operated by British Satellite Broadcasting.

The station, focused on general entertainment and children's programming, was one of the five BSB channels, based at the network's headquarters at Marco Polo House in Battersea.

Galaxy broadcast a mix of original programming, American imports and archive repeats from the BBC library. Its most infamous production was Heil Honey I'm Home, a sitcom about Adolf Hitler, which aired only its pilot episode.

History

Original programmes
Some of the programmes made for Galaxy included:

Jupiter Moon

Jupiter Moon was Galaxy's sci-fi soap opera, shown three times a week (on Mondays, Wednesdays, and Fridays at 6.30pm), with an omnibus at weekends. 150 episodes were made, but only the first 108 were broadcast by Galaxy before it closed, while the last 42 episodes would air six years later on the Sci Fi Channel. The cast included Richard Derrington, Anna Chancellor, Alison Dowling, Lucy Benjamin, Fay Masterson, Richard Lintern and Jason Durr. The entire series has been released on Region 1 DVD.

Up Yer News
This was Galaxy's topical satire show, which aired a 15-minute episode each weeknight. It featured Chris Morris, Armando Iannucci, Stewart Lee, Richard Herring, Patrick Marber, Steve Coogan, Rebecca Front, Doon Mackichan, David Schneider, Jon Thomson, Al Murray, Julian Clary, Stephen Fry, David Baddiel, Rob Newman, Steve Punt, Hugh Dennis, Henry Normal, Fred Harris, Jo Brand, Mark Heap, and Alistair McGowan.

The Happening
A weekly 90-minute music and comedy show presented by Jools Holland.

31 West
Galaxy's showbiz magazine show broadcast each weeknight, 6.00–6.30pm, presented by Simon Potter, Debbie Flint and Shyama Perera and soap expert Chris Stacey. The show got its name from the placing of BSB's Marcopolo Satellite at 31 degrees west.

The Last Laugh
Stand-up comedy show. Comedians featured included Ben Elton, Nick Revell, Jack Dee, Kevin Day, Simon Fanshawe, Punt and Dennis, Norman Lovett, Mark Steel and Mark Thomas.

Corrigan & Womack
This was a comedy series, starring Bernadine Corrigan and Steve Womack, where they would perform comedy sketches. This show was carried over to Sky One following Galaxy's closure.

Doctor Who weekend
Galaxy broadcast early episodes of Doctor Who every week, and on the weekend of Saturday 22 and Sunday 23 September, the channel presented a complete weekend.
Saturday 22 September: 9.15am An Unearthly Child, 11.15am The Daleks (episodes 1–3), 12.35pm Doctor Who's Who's Who, 1.40pm The Daleks (episodes 4–7), 3.30pm The Edge of Destruction, 4.30pm The Yeti Rarities (The Abominable Snowmen episode 2 and The Web of Fear episode 1), 6.00pm The Space Museum, 8.00 The Keys of Marinus, 11.00pm The Aztecs, 1.00am Dr. Who and the Daleks (film).
Sunday 23 September: 9.15am The War Games (episodes 1–5), 11.30am Whose Doctor Who, 12.45pm The War Games (episodes 6–10), 3.00pm The Dominators, 5.45pm The Mind Robber, 8.00pm The Three Doctors, 10.00pm Daleks – Invasion Earth: 2150 A.D. (film), 11.30pm The Yeti Rarities (The Abominable Snowmen episode 2 and The Web of Fear episode 1), 12.30am The Edge of Destruction.
Between the stories, there were also many editions of BSB's own programme, 31 Who, presented by Debbie Flint, Shyama Perera and John Nathan-Turner, and featuring interviews with Sylvester McCoy, Carole Ann Ford, Elisabeth Sladen, Peter Purves, Wendy Padbury, Terrance Dicks, Bob Baker & Dave Martin, Nicholas Courtney, William Russell, Jon Pertwee, Frazer Hines, Deborah Watling and many more.

BBC programmes
The archive BBC programmes on Galaxy were:

 Doctor Who (occasional airings outside of the Galaxy Club strand)
 Secret Army
 The Goodies
 Steptoe and Son
 Dad's Army 
 Porridge
 Till Death Us Do Part
 Are You Being Served? 
 The Young Ones
 Target

American imports
The American programmes on Galaxy were:

 The Facts of Life
 Night Court
 The Outer Limits
 China Beach
 Murphy Brown
 Doctor Doctor
 Designing Women
 Hill Street Blues
 Parker Lewis Can't Lose
 The Young and the Restless
 The Bold and the Beautiful
 Hotel
 Naked City
 Mike Hammer
 Police Story
 Baby Boom

Galaxy Club
The station also broadcast children's programmes under the 'Galaxy Club' strand, which featured original programming, mixed with imported cartoons and series.

Logo
The Galaxy logo, along with all the BSB logos, has been critically acclaimed. On the TV Ark website, an archive of British television presentation history, Hayden Walker writes: There is no doubt the BSB identity was a serious coherent design. The project of work stretched back over a year and included product designers, model makers, composers and other specialists. The BSB identities emerged with startling clarity, with an upmarket pitch. Stylish and distinctive both on screen and in print, Lambie-Nairn designed identities which told stories. And of the Galaxy logo in particular: The ident had a lovely warmth to it, with animated swirls of colours and stars.

Galaxy archives
Apart from Jupiter Moon and many of Galaxy's imported programming, the vast majority of the original programming made for broadcast by Galaxy, such as Up Yer News and The Happening, is now missing. Most was made by various independent production companies, including Noel Gay Television, with both the broadcaster and production company deleting their master copies – each thinking the other will have kept theirs.

Closure
Following the merger of BSB and Sky, the decision was taken to hand over Galaxy's transponder to Sky One, who took only a few programmes from Galaxy and incorporated them into its channels line up. Galaxy closed down for the last time at 1.00am on 2 December 1990, ending with a clean playout of the main ident, which quickly zoomed out of vision before fading to the station's test card.

See also
 UK Gold

References

External links
 Galaxy at TVARK

Sky television channels
Defunct television channels in the United Kingdom
Television channels and stations established in 1990
Television channels and stations disestablished in 1990
1990 in the United Kingdom
1990 in British television
1990s in the United Kingdom
1990s in British television
History of television in the United Kingdom